This article shows the rosters of all participating teams at the Women's U23 World Championship 2015 in Turkey.

Pool A

The following is the Turkish roster in the 2015 FIVB Volleyball Women's U23 World Championship.

Head Coach: Ferhat Akbaş

The following is the Brazilian roster in the 2015 FIVB Volleyball Women's U23 World Championship.

Head Coach: Wagner Coppini Fernandes

The following is the Italian roster in the 2015 FIVB Volleyball Women's U23 World Championship.

Head Coach: Luca Cristofani

The following is the Bulgarian roster in the 2015 FIVB Volleyball Women's U23 World Championship.

Head Coach: Atanas Lazarov

The following is the Colombian roster in the 2015 FIVB Volleyball Women's U23 World Championship.

Head Coach: Eduardo Guillaume

The following is the Egyptian roster in the 2015 FIVB Volleyball Women's U23 World Championship.

Head Coach: Strahil Pantchev Balov

Pool B

The following is the Dominican roster in the 2015 FIVB Volleyball Women's U23 World Championship.

Head Coach: Wagner Pacheco

The following is the Japanese roster in the 2015 FIVB Volleyball Women's U23 World Championship.

Head Coach: Kiyoshi Abo

The following is the Chinese roster in the 2015 FIVB Volleyball Women's U23 World Championship.

Head Coach: Xu Jiande

The following is the Thai roster in the 2015 FIVB Volleyball Women's U23 World Championship.

Head Coach: Nataphon Srisamutnak

The following is the Peruvian roster in the 2015 FIVB Volleyball Women's U23 World Championship.

Head Coach: Natalia Malaga

The following is the Cuban roster in the 2015 FIVB Volleyball Women's U23 World Championship.

Head Coach: Wilfredo Robinson Pupo

See also
2015 FIVB Volleyball Men's U23 World Championship squads

References

External links
Official website

FIVB Volleyball Women's U23 World Championship
Fivb Women's U23 Volleyball
2015 in Turkish sport
World
2015
FIVB Volleyball World Championship squads